Syntrechalea is a genus of spiders in the family Trechaleidae. It was first described in 1902 by F. O. Pickard-Cambridge. , it contains 12 species.

Species
Syntrechalea comprises the following species:
Syntrechalea adis Carico, 2008
Syntrechalea boliviensis (Carico, 1993)
Syntrechalea brasilia Carico, 2008
Syntrechalea caballero Carico, 2008
Syntrechalea caporiacco Carico, 2008
Syntrechalea lomalinda (Carico, 1993)
Syntrechalea napoensis Carico, 2008
Syntrechalea neblina Silva & Lise, 2010
Syntrechalea reimoseri (Caporiacco, 1947)
Syntrechalea robusta Silva & Lise, 2010
Syntrechalea syntrechaloides (Mello-Leitão, 1941)
Syntrechalea tenuis F. O. Pickard-Cambridge, 1902

References

Trechaleidae
Araneomorphae genera
Spiders of Mexico
Spiders of Central America
Spiders of South America